Owsianka may refer to the following places in Poland:
Owsianka, Lower Silesian Voivodeship (south-west Poland)
Owsianka, Pomeranian Voivodeship (north Poland)